Nikolovski, a Macedonian surname, and may refer to:
 Martin Nikolovski
 Goce Nikolovski
 Igor Nikolovski, Macedonian footballer
 Jane Nikolovski, Macedonian footballer
in female form it is Nikolovska:
 Monika Nikolovska
 Rosica Nikolovska
 Ljiljana Nikolovska

See also 
 Nikolov, Bulgarian surname
 Nikolic, Serbian surname
 Nicholas, given name and origin of the surname

Macedonian-language surnames

Patronymic surnames